Oleg Pavlovich Negrobov (22 November 1941, Voronezh – 8 January 2021) was a Russian entomologist, Professor, doctor of science (biology) from Voronezh. He studied in Voronezh State University. He described more than 350 taxa of Dolichopodidae, a family of flies. The fly genera Negrobovia and Olegonegrobovia were named in his honor.

Negrobov was a member of the Civic Chamber of Voronezh Oblast.

References

Sources 
 O. P. Negrobov

1941 births
2021 deaths
Russian entomologists
Soviet zoologists
Dipterists
Soviet entomologists
Voronezh State University alumni
21st-century Russian zoologists
20th-century Russian zoologists
People from Voronezh